Fabricio Díaz Badaracco (born 3 February 2003) is a Uruguayan professional footballer who plays as a midfielder for Uruguayan Primera División club Liverpool Montevideo.

Club career
Díaz is a youth academy graduate of Liverpool Montevideo. He made his professional debut for the club on 2 February 2020 in 4–2 supercup win against Nacional. He played whole 120 minutes in the match and scored his team's fourth goal. He made his league and continental debut the same month in 1–0 win against Plaza Colonia and 2–0 win against Llaneros de Guanare respectively.

International career
Díaz is a Uruguayan youth international. On 22 March 2022, he was called up to the senior team for the first time as a replacement for Matías Vecino who tested positive for COVID-19. On 21 October 2022, he was named in Uruguay's 55-man preliminary squad for the 2022 FIFA World Cup.

Career statistics

Honours
Liverpool Montevideo
 Supercopa Uruguaya: 2020

Individual
 Uruguayan Primera División Team of the Year: 2022

References

External links
 

2003 births
Living people
Uruguayan sportspeople of Italian descent
Uruguayan footballers
Uruguayan Primera División players
Liverpool F.C. (Montevideo) players
Association football midfielders